Dongfeng station may refer to:

 Dongfeng station (Guangzhou Metro), a station on Line 14 (Guangzhou Metro)
 Dongfeng station (Wuxi Metro), a station on Line 3 (Wuxi Metro)
 , a station on Line 3 and Line 12 of Beijing Subway